Bishop William Andrew Macdonell, Roman Catholic Bishop of Alexandria in Ontario, Canada was born on 30 November 1853 at Rivière-aux-Raisins, Saint Clair County, Michigan.

Life
On 11 September 1881, aged 27, he was ordained a priest. On 21 March 1906, aged 52, he was
appointed Bishop of Alexandria in Ontario, Canada, and was ordained as such three months later, on 24 June 1906.

Death
He died on 17 November 1920, aged 67. He had been a priest for 39 years and a bishop for 14 years.

External links
Catholic Hierarchy website 

1853 births
1920 deaths
People from St. Clair County, Michigan
People from Cornwall, Ontario
Canadian people of Scottish descent
20th-century Roman Catholic bishops in Canada